Blood Will Tell is a 1927 American silent Western film directed by Ray Flynn and written by Paul Gangelin. The film stars Buck Jones, Katherine Perry, Lawford Davidson, Bob Kortman, Harry Gripp and Austen Jewell. The film was released on November 13, 1927, by Fox Film Corporation.

Cast
 Buck Jones as Buck Peters
 Katherine Perry as Sally Morgan
 Lawford Davidson as Jim Cowen
 Bob Kortman as Carloon 
 Harry Gripp as Sandy
 Austen Jewell as Buddy Morgan

References

External links 
 

1927 films
Fox Film films
1927 Western (genre) films
American black-and-white films
Silent American Western (genre) films
1920s English-language films
1920s American films